The 2023 North Texas Mean Green football team will represent the University of North Texas as a member of American Athletic Conference (The American) during the 2023 NCAA Division I FBS football season. They are led by first-year head coach Eric Morris. The Mean Green play their home games at Apogee Stadium in Denton, Texas.

Previous season

The Mean Green finished the 2022 season 7–7, 6–2 in Conference USA play to finish in second place in the Conference. They lost to UTSA 48–27 in the C-USA Championship. They played in the Frisco Bowl where they lost 35–32 to Boise State.

On October 21, 2021, North Texas accepted the invitation to join the American Athletic Conference (AAC) and will become a full-member on July 1, 2023. The 2022 season is expected to be the program's last season as a member of Conference USA.

Offseason

Coaching changes
After 7 season, on December 4, 2022, the Mean Green fired head coach Seth Littrell.

On December 13, 2022, the Mean Green hired Eric Morris to be their next head coach, he will be the teams 20th head coach. He was previsouly the offensive coordinator for Washington State .

On December 28, 2022, the Mean Green hired Chris Gilbert as their assistant head coach he will also coach the tight ends. Also on December 28 they added Drew Svoboda as their special teams coach and associate head coach, Patrick Cobbs as the running backs coach, and Sean Brophy as the quarterbacks coach. Additionally they hired Rolando Surita as their chief of staff

The next day on December 29, 2022, the Mean Green made five hires. They hired Matt Caponi as their defensive coordinator and cornbacks coach, Jordan Davis as their offensive coordinator and wide receivers coach, and Colby Kratch as their linebackers coach. They Also named Bryan Kegans the Director of Strength & Conditioning, and Justin Owens as their Director of Recruiting.

And on December 30, 2022, the Mean Green made the last of their hirings naming Clay Jennings as their safties coach and Demerick Gary as their defensive line coach.

Schedule
North Texas and the American Athletic Conference (AAC) announced the 2023 football schedule on February 21, 2023.

References

North Texas
North Texas Mean Green football seasons
North Texas Mean Green football